Bongani ("Wonderboy") Mahlangu (born 7 October 1979) is a South African professional boxer. As an amateur, he participated in the 2004 Summer Olympics, where he was stopped in the first round of the lightweight division by Azerbaijan's Rovshan Huseynov.

Mahlangu won the silver medal in the same division one year earlier, at the All-Africa Games in Abuja, Nigeria.

Professional boxing record

References

External links
 

1979 births
Living people
Lightweight boxers
Boxers at the 2004 Summer Olympics
Olympic boxers of South Africa
Boxers at the 2006 Commonwealth Games
Commonwealth Games competitors for South Africa
South African male boxers
African Games silver medalists for South Africa
African Games medalists in boxing
Competitors at the 2003 All-Africa Games
Southpaw boxers